Dysoxylum magnificum is a tree in the family Meliaceae. The specific epithet  is from the Latin meaning "magnificent".

Description
The bark is brownish. The flowers are white. The fruits are brown when young, cream-coloured when ripe, roundish, at least  in diameter.

Distribution and habitat
Dysoxylum magnificum is found in Sumatra and Borneo. Its habitat is rain forests from sea-level to  altitude.

References

magnificum
Trees of Sumatra
Trees of Borneo
Plants described in 1994